Francisco Ciutat de Miguel, known as Angelito (1909 – November 30, 1986), was a Spanish communist, lieutenant of infantry and commander.

Spanish Civil War
He fought the Battle of Santander, during the Spanish Civil War, in the summer of 1937 as a Chief of Operations of the Army of the North.

Outside Spain
After the end of the Spanish Civil War, de Miguel fled to the Soviet Union, where he joined the Voroshilov Academy and married Sofía Kokuina. He later participated as a foreign military advisor to the Cuban Army during  the Bay of Pigs Invasion. He also assisted the Algerian Army against Morocco during the Sand War and participated in the Vietnam War.

He later returned to Spain in 1977 after the death of Francisco Franco.

Aliases
He had many aliases:
 Masonic name: Algazel 
 Russian name: Pavel Pablovich Stepanov
 Cuban alias: Ángel Martínez Riosola
 Short name: Paco
 Commonly referred to as Angelito

Bibliography
 Relatos y reflexiones de la Guerra de España 1936-1939 - Francisco Ciutat de Miguel. Forma Ediciones. Madrid 1978.

References

1909 births
1986 deaths
Spanish colonels
Spanish communists
Military personnel of the Vietnam War
Soviet military personnel
Exiles of the Spanish Civil War in the Soviet Union
Military Academy of the General Staff of the Armed Forces of the Soviet Union alumni